Cachet Evelyn Lue (born March 26, 1997) is a Canadian-born Jamaican footballer who plays as a defender for the Jamaica women's national team.

International career
Lue represented Jamaica at the 2012 CONCACAF Women's U-17 Championship, 2013 CONCACAF Women's U-17 Championship, and the 2014 CONCACAF Women's U-20 Championship qualifying. She made her senior debut in a 1–0 friendly win against Chile on 3 March 2019.

References 

1997 births
Living people
Citizens of Jamaica through descent
Jamaican women's footballers
Women's association football defenders
TCU Horned Frogs women's soccer players
Minnesota Golden Gophers women's soccer players
FC Dallas (women) players
Soccer players from Mississauga
Women's Premier Soccer League players
Jamaica women's international footballers
Jamaican expatriate footballers
Jamaican expatriate sportspeople in the United States
Expatriate women's soccer players in the United States
Canadian women's soccer players
Black Canadian women's soccer players
Canadian sportspeople of Jamaican descent
Canadian expatriate soccer players
Canadian expatriate sportspeople in the United States